Natalee Holloway is a 2009 American television film directed by Mikael Salomon based on Beth Holloway's book about the 2005 disappearance of her daughter Natalee Holloway. The film stars Amy Gumenick as Natalee Holloway, Tracy Pollan as Beth Holloway-Twitty and Jacques Strydom as Joran van der Sloot. When it aired on the Lifetime Movie Network on April 19, 2009, the film scored the highest television ratings at that time in the network's history.

Production
In October 2008, the Lifetime Movie Network announced plans to create a television film based on Beth Holloway's bestselling book Loving Natalee: A Mother's Testament of Hope and Faith. The senior vice president of original movies, Tanya Lopez, stated in the announcement that the network was "pleased to be working closely with Natalee's mother" and that they intended to tell the story of Natalee Holloway's disappearance "sensitively and accurately." Jarett Wieselman of the New York Post questioned whether it was too soon for such a film to be made. Holloway said that she was not sure at first that she could take this step, but felt that it was "the right thing to do" after meeting the creative staff in Los Angeles, California. Sara Paxton was first offered the part of Natalee. But Paxton turned down the role feeling it was still too soon after Holloway's disappearance to make a film because it was still being covered in the media. Spencer Redford, was also considered for the role of Natalee.

The film was shot in Cape Town, South Africa, and produced by Sony Pictures Television with Von Zerneck Sertner Films. Holloway's book was adapted for television by Teena Booth, who had previously written A Little Thing Called Murder and Fab Five: The Texas Cheerleader Scandal for Lifetime Television. Holloway said that she was fascinated and at first overwhelmed by the logistics of the production, which she views "as an accomplishment."

Plot
The film retells events leading up to the night of Natalee Holloway's disappearance in Aruba, and the ensuing investigation in the aftermath. The film does not solve the case, but stages re-creations of various scenarios, based on the testimony of key players and suspects, including Joran van der Sloot, who is the last person seen drinking with her and escorting her out of the bar. His contradictory accounts, some presented days and others presented years later, are used to present different reenactments of Holloway's final hours before she went missing.

Cast
 Tracy Pollan as Beth Holloway-Twitty, Natalee's mother
 Wayne Harrison as Dave Holloway, Natalee's father
 Grant Show as George "Jug" Twitty, Natalee's stepfather
 Amy Gumenick as Natalee Holloway, graduating high school student who disappeared in Aruba
 Kai Coetzee as Matt Holloway, Natalee's brother
 Sean Michael as Paul van der Sloot, father of Joran van der Sloot
 Jacques Strydom as Joran van der Sloot, suspect in Natalee's disappearance
 Clayton Evertson as Deepak Kalpoe, friend of Joran van der Sloot
 Cokey Falkow as Patrick van der Eem, working in an undercover investigation
 Catherine Dent as Carol Standifer, friend of Beth Holloway-Twitty

Broadcast
The April 19, 2009 broadcast attracted 3.2 million viewers and more than 1 million women in the 18-49 age group, garnering the highest Nielsen ratings in the Lifetime Movie Network's 11-year history at that time.

Reception
Although the movie set ratings records for Lifetime, the movie was not received well by critic Alec Harvey of The Birmingham News. Harvey called the movie "sloppy and uneven, a forgettable look at the tragedy that consumed the nation's attention for months". However, Jake Meaney of PopMatters found the film to be surprisingly "calm and levelheaded", and praised Tracy Pollan's portrayal of Beth Holloway. Holloway said that she was honored by Pollan's portrayal and that there "could not have been a better choice."

Joran van der Sloot himself watched the film one evening in 2010, according to his friend John Ludwick, and said that some parts were true while others were not.

Home media
The film was released on DVD for home video on November 10, 2009 by Sony Pictures. It was released internationally on DVD in January 2010 in the Netherlands, Germany, and Argentina. It has also been released in France, Greece, and Spain.

Sequel
A follow-up television film, Justice for Natalee Holloway, with Pollan, Show, and Gumerick reprising their roles from the first film and Stephen Amell taking the part of Joran van der Sloot, aired on May 9, 2011 on the Lifetime Movie Network. The sequel film takes place five years after the 2005 disappearance of Natalee Holloway, as Beth Twitty partners with the FBI in trying to bring Joran van der Sloot to justice.

References

External links
 
Natalee Holloway at the Lifetime Movie Network

2009 television films
2009 films
2000s biographical films
2000s crime drama films
2000s mystery films
American biographical films
American crime drama films
American mystery films
Films based on autobiographies
Films directed by Mikael Salomon
Films set in 2005
Films set in Aruba
Films shot in South Africa
Lifetime (TV network) films
Crime films based on actual events
2009 drama films
American drama television films
2000s English-language films
2000s American films